Cassie Kozyrkov is a South African data scientist and statistician. She founded the field of Decision Intelligence at Google, where she serves as Chief Decision Scientist.

Early life and education 
Kozyrkov was born in Saint Petersburg, Russia, and grew up in Port Elizabeth, South Africa. As a child, Kozyrkov became interested in data when she discovered spreadsheet software and later became interested in the relationship between information and decision-making. She began her studies in economics and mathematical statistics at Nelson Mandela University at the age of fifteen, and transferred to the University of Chicago to complete her undergraduate degree. After graduation, Kozyrkov worked as a project manager and researcher at the University of Chicago Center for Cognitive and Social Neuroscience, then enrolled in graduate studies at Duke University in psychology and cognitive neuroscience with a focus on neuroeconomics. Her research involves the neural processing of value and economic preferences.

Career 

Kozyrkov joined Google as a statistician in the Research and Machine Intelligence division in 2014. She originally worked for Google in Mountain View, before moving to New York City a few months later. After two years, she was promoted to Chief Data Scientist in the Office of the CTO at Google in 2016 and to Chief Decision Scientist in 2017. Her area of focus at Google is on applied AI and data science process architecture. 

Kozyrkov is also a technology evangelist and has been called a data science thought leader. She has been a keynote speaker at large conferences, including Web Summit, the world's largest technology event. She publishes data science articles on her own blog, and her writing has also been featured on Harvard Business Review and Forbes.  She was selected by LinkedIn as the #1 Top Voice in Data Science and Analytics for 2019 and appeared on the cover of the Forbes AI data science issue.

References

External links 

Living people
Year of birth missing (living people)
South African women computer scientists
Google people
People from Port Elizabeth
Duke University alumni
Nelson Mandela University alumni
University of Chicago alumni